Orelha Negra are a Portuguese instrumental hip-hop/funk/soul band, formed in 2009. The band consists of Sam The Kid (samplers, synthesizer), Francisco Rebelo (bass), João Gomes (keyboards), Fred Ferreira (drums) and DJ Cruzfader (turntables).

To date, all of Orelha Negra's studio albums are self-titled. Their third album reached number-one in the Portuguese album charts in 2017.

Members 

 Sam The Kid – samplers, synthesizer
 Francisco Rebelo – bass
 João Gomes – keyboards
 Fred Ferreira – drums
 DJ Cruzfader – turntables

Discography

Studio albums

Collaboration albums 

 Mixtape (2011)
 Mixtape II (2013)

References

External links 

Musical groups established in 2009
2009 establishments in Portugal
Musical quintets